Dirt is the third studio album by Canadian country music artist Dean Brody. It was released on April 24, 2012 via Open Road Recordings under the production of Matt Rovey. Its first single, "Canadian Girls," peaked at number 36 on the Canadian Hot 100 in February 2012.

Dirt was nominated for Country Album of the Year at the 2013 Juno Awards.

Track listing

Chart performance

Album

Singles

Certifications

References

2012 albums
Dean Brody albums
Open Road Recordings albums
Canadian Country Music Association Album of the Year albums